The finite strip method is a technique of structural analysis used for bridge and tall structure design as well and in the design of construction components such as steel beams. The technique was first introduced in 1968 and is less powerful and versatile than the finite element method but is more efficient in terms of computation power in some situations.

References

Cheung, Y.K. “Finite strip method in structural analysis”, Pergamon Press, 1976.
"Developments in Tall Buildings 1983". . Pages 571 - 572.
Cheung, Y.K. and Tham, L.G. “Finite strip method”, CRC Press, 1998.
Schafer, B.W., Ádány, S. “Buckling analysis of cold-formed steel members using CUFSM: conventional and constrained finite strip methods.” Eighteenth International Specialty Conference on Cold-Formed Steel Structures, Orlando, FL. October 2006. (pdf)

External links
CUFSM software for conducting finite strip analysis on structural beams.

Civil engineering